Gwydir Shire was a local government area in the New England region of New South Wales, Australia.

Gwydir Shire was proclaimed on 7 March 1906, one of 134 shires created after the passing of the Local Government (Shires) Act 1905.

The shire offices were based in Bingara.

The Shire was amalgamated with the Municipality of Bingara to form Bingara Shire on 1 January 1944.

References

Former local government areas of New South Wales
1906 establishments in Australia
1944 disestablishments in Australia